Anderson Inlet (Boonwurrung: Toluncan), sometimes incorrectly referred to as Andersons Inlet, is a shallow and dynamic estuary in South Gippsland, Victoria, Australia where the Tarwin River enters Bass Strait.  It forms a  almost enclosed bay next to the town of Inverloch, for which it provides a popular and protected beach.  At low tide its intertidal mudflats provide important feeding habitat for migratory waders.   It is also an important area for recreational fishing.  It is named after Samuel Anderson pioneer explorer the first European to settle in the area.

Tourism
Inverloch is an important tourist town, with visitor numbers swelling in the summer months
due to the coastal lifestyle and proximity to Melbourne. Anderson Inlet's popularity is hinged on the almost-enclosed bay, making it a protected beach with safe swimming. At low tide the surf beach can be accessed on foot around the western headland. Anderson Inlet is also a popular recreational boating area with a boat ramp jetty. Because of its tidal nature, the areas where vessels can operate is restricted for the safety of the tourists as the depth of the water varies. Knowledge of the inlet is a must to cross the bar and the operators of vessels are required to carry tide tables while going out in the water.

Anderson Inlet is also a base for many walking and cycling trails including the Screw Creek Nature Trail and the Bass Coast Rail Trail which is Victoria's only coastal rail trail. The inlet is close to national parks including the Anderson Inlet Coastal Reserve and the Bunurong Marine and Coastal Park.

Birds
Anderson Inlet is classified by BirdLife International as an Important Bird Area.  It supports internationally significant numbers (up to over 6,000 individuals) of red-necked stint.  It has also been known to support the critically endangered orange-bellied parrot, with six birds seen there in 1998 and two in 1999.

Gallery

References

External links 
 Screw Creek Nature Walk
 Bass Coast Rail Trail
 Bunurong Marine Park
 Anderson Inlet Coastal Reserve

Bays of Victoria (Australia)
Important Bird Areas of Victoria (Australia)
Gippsland (region)
Inlets of Australia